Hazel Grove is a constituency in Greater Manchester represented in the House of Commons of the UK Parliament since 2015 by William Wragg, a Conservative.

Constituency profile
The constituency was first used at the February 1974 general election, having previously formed part of the Cheadle constituency. It covers the south-eastern edge of the Greater Manchester conurbation and an area of countryside to the east bordering the Peak District. Residents are wealthier than average for the North West and the UK as a whole.

Boundaries 

1974–1983: The Urban Districts of Bredbury and Romiley, Hazel Grove and Bramhall, and Marple.

From 1 April 1974 until the next boundary review came into effect for the 1983 general election, the constituency comprised parts of the Metropolitan Borough of Stockport in Greater Manchester, but its boundaries were unchanged.

1983–2010: The Metropolitan Borough of Stockport wards of Bredbury, Great Moor, Hazel Grove, Marple North, Marple South and Romiley.

Bramhall was transferred back to Cheadle. The Great Moor ward, incorporating the community of Offerton, was transferred from the abolished Stockport South constituency.

2010–present: The Metropolitan Borough of Stockport wards of Bredbury and Woodley, Bredbury Green and Romiley, Hazel Grove, Marple North, Marple South and High Lane, and Offerton.

Boundaries adjusted to take account of revision of local authority wards.

Political history 
At its first election in February 1974, the seat was won by Michael Winstanley of the Liberal Party, who had been the MP for Cheadle between 1966 and 1970.  Winstanley only held it for a few months because, at the general election in October 1974, he lost to the Conservatives' Tom Arnold.

Arnold held the seat until 1997, although (with the exception of the 1979 election) this was with small majorities over the local Liberals/SDP-Liberal Alliance/Liberal Democrats' candidate.  At the 1997 general election, Arnold stood down and the seat was taken by Andrew Stunell of the Liberal Democrats.  Stunell held the seat until his retirement in 2015, although with reduced majorities.

The Conservative share of the vote fell in Hazel Grove in both the 2001 and 2005 general elections, from a (winning) peak under Tom Arnold of 44.8% in 1992 to a low of 29.7% in 2005.  Following three failed attempts to increase the share of the vote (1997, 2001 and 2005), this decline was reversed in the 2010 election by Annesley Abercorn, who achieved a 33.6% share of the vote (+3.9%) and a 2.4% swing from the Liberal Democrats to the Conservatives.

Members of Parliament

Elections

Elections in the 2010s

Elections in the 2000s

Elections in the 1990s

Elections in the 1980s 

Major boundary changes occurred at this election. The vote changes compare with estimates for the 1979 election on the same boundaries.

Elections in the 1970s

See also 
 List of parliamentary constituencies in Greater Manchester
History of parliamentary constituencies and boundaries in Cheshire

Notes

References

Sources 
 Election results 1974–2001

External links 
 Photos of Hazel Grove

Parliamentary constituencies in Greater Manchester
Constituencies of the Parliament of the United Kingdom established in 1974
Politics of the Metropolitan Borough of Stockport